The discography of K-Ci & JoJo, an American R&B duo made up of Cedric and Joel Hailey, consists of five studio albums, five compilation albums, fifteen singles, and fifteen music videos. K-Ci & JoJo were originally the lead singers of the R&B group Jodeci before signing a record deal with MCA Records. In 1997, they released their debut album, Love Always. In the United States, Love Always peaked at number five on the Billboard 200, and number two on the Top R&B/Hip-Hop Albums chart and was certified triple-platinum by the Recording Industry Association of America (RIAA). Internationally, the album reached the top 50 on the Swiss, Canadian, and Australian Charts,  and appeared on the UK and Swedish Albums Chart. The album produced four singles, including the multi-national number-one song, "All My Life".

In 1999, K-Ci & JoJo released their second studio album, It's Real. It peaked at number eight on the Billboard 200, number two on the R&B/Hip Hop Albums chart, and was certified platinum by the RIAA. Internationally, the album reached top 20 on the Dutch Mega Album Top 100, the Canadian Albums Chart, and appeared on the New Zealand Top 40 Albums and the Australian Albums Chart. The album spawned four singles, including "Tell Me It's Real", which peaked at number two in the US on the Billboard Hot 100. The duo's third studio album, X, was released in 2000. The album peaked at number twenty on the Billboard 200, number three on the Top R&B/Hip-Hop Albums chart, and was certified platinum by the RIAA. The album also appeared on the New Zealand Top 40 Albums and the Dutch Mega Album Top 100. The album produced three singles: "Crazy", "All The Things I Should Have Known", and "Wanna Do You Right", with the first peaking at number eleven on the Hot 100.

Emotional (2002) was the duo's fourth studio album to be released. Emotional peaked at number sixty-one on the Billboard 200 and number eighteen on the Top R&B/Hip-Hop Albums chart. The album produced two singles, yet neither charted on the Billboard Hot 100. K-Ci & JoJo followed the release of Emotional with three compilation albums: All My Life: Their Greatest Hits (2005), peaking at number fifty-two on the Billboard 200 and number eighteen on the Top R&B/Hip-Hop Albums chart, 20th Century Masters – Millennium Collection: The Best of K-Ci & Jojo (2006) and Ballad Collection for Lovers (2007). The duo released a Japan-only album, Love (2008), followed by another compilation album, Playlist Your Way (2008). Neither album charted.

Albums

Studio albums

Compilation albums

Singles

As lead artist

As featured artist

Music videos

Notes 
A  United States sales figures for Love Always as of June 1999.
B  "Fee Fie Foe Fum" did not enter R&B/Hip-Hop Songs, but peaked at number one on Bubbling Under R&B/Hip-Hop Singles, a chart which acts like a 25-song extension to R&B/Hip-Hop Songs.
C  "Girl" did not enter the Billboard Hot 100, but peaked at number thirty on the Rhythmic Top 40, a component chart of the Hot 100.
D  "All The Things I Should Have Known" did not enter the Billboard Hot 100, but peaked at number thirty on the Rhythmic Top 40, a component chart of the Hot 100.
E   "It's Me" did not enter R&B/Hip-Hop Songs, but peaked at number five on Bubbling Under R&B/Hip-Hop Singles, a chart which acts like a 25-song extension to R&B/Hip-Hop Songs.

References 

General
 
 

Specific

External links 
[ K-Ci & JoJo overview] at Allmusic

Discographies of American artists
Rhythm and blues discographies
Soul music discographies